After School Session is the debut studio album by rock and roll artist Chuck Berry, released in May 1957 by Chess Records. With the exception of two tracks, "Roly Poly" and "Berry Pickin'", all selections had been previously released on 45 rpm singles. It is the second long-playing album released by the Chess label.

Recording sessions
The songs on After School Session were taken from Berry's first five sessions for Leonard and Phil Chess, which took place at Universal Recording Corporation in Chicago. "Wee Wee Hours" was the first to be recorded, on May 21, 1955. "Together (We'll Always Be)" was recorded in September 1955. At the next session, on December 20, 1955, Berry recorded "Roly Poly" (also known as "Rolli Polli"), "No Money Down", "Berry Pickin'", and "Down Bound Train". The third session was on April 16, 1956, when he recorded "Too Much Monkey Business", "Brown Eyed Handsome Man", and "Drifting Heart". "Havana Moon" was recorded on October 29, 1956. The last session took place on January 21, 1957, when he recorded "School Days" and "Deep Feeling".

Release
The album was released in May 1957 on Chess Records, catalogue LP 1426. It is the second long-playing album released by the label.

Singles
The first song on the original version of After School Session to be released was "Wee Wee Hours", the B-side of "Maybellene", issued in July 1955. It peaked at number 10 on Billboard magazine's R&B Singles chart. The next song to be released was "Together We Will Always Be", the B-side of "Thirty Days", in September 1955. The next two songs released were "No Money Down" backed with "Down Bound Train", in December 1955, the former peaking at number 8 on the R&B Singles chart. In May 1956, "Drifting Heart" was released as the B-side of "Roll Over Beethoven". Berry's next single, "Too Much Monkey Business" backed with "Brown Eyed Handsome Man", was released in September 1956; these songs reached number 4 and number 5 on the R&B Singles chart, respectively. "Havana Moon", the B-side of "You Can't Catch Me", was released in November 1956. The last single from the album to be released was "School Day (Ring Ring Goes the Bell)" backed with "Deep Feeling", in March 1957, with the former reaching number 1 on the R&B Singles chart and number 3 on the Hot 100.

Reception

Track listing

Personnel

Musicians
 Chuck Berry –  steel guitar on "Deep Feeling", vocals, guitar
 Johnnie Johnson –  piano
 Willie Dixon –  bass
 Fred Below –  drums
 L. C. Davis – tenor saxophone on "Too Much Monkey Business" and "Drifting Heart"
 Jasper Thomas – drums
 Ebby Hardy – drums
 Otis Spann –  piano
 Jimmy Rogers –  guitar
 Jerome Green – maracas on "Maybellene"

Technical
 Leonard Chess –  producer
 Phil Chess –  producer
 Andy McKaie – reissue producer
 Erick Labson – digital remastering
 Vartan – art direction
 Don Snowden – liner notes

Release history

References

External links

 

Chuck Berry albums
1957 debut albums
Chess Records albums
Albums produced by Phil Chess
Albums produced by Leonard Chess